Dan Murray (born 1934) is an Irish former Gaelic footballer who played as a right corner-back for the Cork senior team.

Murray joined the team during the 1954 championship and was a regular member of the starting fifteen until his retirement after the 1959 championship. During that time he won one National League medal and two Munster medals, however, he failed to capture an All-Ireland medal.

Murray began his club career with Canovee and UCC before later winning two county championship medals with Macroom. He also played hurling with Cloughduv.

References

1934 births
Living people
Dual players
Cloughduv hurlers
UCC Gaelic footballers
Macroom Gaelic footballers
Cork inter-county Gaelic footballers
Munster inter-provincial Gaelic footballers